Travis Nichols is an American poet and novelist. He works for Greenpeace USA.

Life
He was born in Ames, Iowa, in 1979.

He is a graduate of the University of Georgia and the University of Massachusetts-Amherst. His first book of poems, Iowa, was published in 2010 by Letter Machine Editions, and his first novel, Off We Go Into the Wild Blue Yonder, was published by Coffee House Press in 2010. His most recent book of poems, See Me Improving, was published by Copper Canyon Press in 2010, and his most recent novel, The More You Ignore Me, was published by Coffee House Press in 2013.

In 2012, he worked with the Yes Men, he helped create the Arctic Ready spoof.

He now lives in Georgia

Selected works

Poetry
Iowa, Letter Machine Editions, 2010,  
See Me Improving, Copper Canyon Press, 2010,

Prose

The More You Ignore Me, Coffee House Press, 2013,

References

1979 births
American male poets
University of Georgia alumni
University of Massachusetts Amherst alumni
People associated with Greenpeace
Living people
American male novelists
People from Ames, Iowa
Poets from Iowa
Novelists from Iowa
21st-century American poets
21st-century American novelists
21st-century American male writers